Iñigo Arteaga Nieto (born 16 December 1972) is a Spanish football manager who is the goalkeeper coach of Al Sadd.

Career

Club career

Arteaga started his career with Spanish La Liga side Real Sociedad. Before the second half of 1996–97, Arteaga signed for Racing de Ferrol in the Spanish third division, where he became the first player to score from a goal kick during a 2–0 win over Moralo.

In 1998, Arteaga signed for Portuguese top flight club Chaves, where he made over 25 league appearances and scored 0 goals and suffered relegation to the Portuguese second division. In 2000, he signed for Burgos in the Spanish third division, helping them earn promotion to the Spanish second division.

Managerial career

In 2014, Arteaga was appointed goalkeeper coach of Spanish La Liga team Málaga. In 2016, he was appointed goalkeeper coach of Rubin in Russia. In 2018, he was appointed goalkeeper coach of English Premier League outfit Watford. In 2021, Arteaga was appointed analyst of Al Sadd in Qatar.

References

External links
 

Spanish football managers
Expatriate footballers in Portugal
Living people
Spanish footballers
Spanish expatriate footballers
Spanish expatriate sportspeople in Qatar
Spanish expatriate sportspeople in Russia
Spanish expatriate sportspeople in England
Spanish expatriate sportspeople in Greece
Association football goalkeepers
G.D. Chaves players
Primeira Liga players
Segunda División B players
Segunda División players
Real Sociedad B footballers
Burgos CF footballers
Real Unión footballers
Spanish expatriate sportspeople in Portugal
Racing de Ferrol footballers
1972 births